The Battle of al-Asnam was a military engagement between the Umayyad governor of ifriqya Handhala ibn Safwan al-Kalbi and the Sufrite Berber insurgents led by Abd al-Wahid ibn Yazid al-Hawwari, the Umayyads Decisively defeated the Berber army, saving Kairoun and Ifriqya from the Berbers.

Battle

In 742 AD, a large two-Berber army marched to attack Kairouan one led by Oqasha ibn Ayub al-Fezari and the other by Abd al-Wahid ibn Yazid al-Hawwari, urgent to meet Oqasha on the battlefield, Handhala dispatched an army of 40,000 cavalry led by a Lakhmite to meet Abd al-Wahid, and fought for a month before they were defeated and lost half of their army, Handhala defeated Oqasha and executed him but withdrew after suffering heavy casualties and prepare for Abd al-Wahid, in Kairoun he recruited the inhabitants and armed them around 5000 armored and 5000 archers, he then marched to meet the Berbers in a place called al-Asnam in Chelif River, the Berber had a large army around 300,000 men, the fighting started, the Arab left flank was overwhelmed by the berber right and were soon to break, however the Arabs defeated the berber left and the center, it wasn't long before the Arab left regained their position and repulsed the berbers killing many of the berbers in the battle, with 180,000 berber killed including Abd al-Wahid, his body was found and his head was decapitated and shown to Handhala.

Handhala reported the victory to Caliph Hisham ibn Abd al-Malik and was delighted to hear the news.

See also
Battle of the Nobles
Battle of Bagdoura
Battle of al-Qarn

References

Nobles
Berber Revolt
742